Chris Parkinson (born 31 March 1950) is a British folk musician. He was a co-founder of the British folk band The House Band (1984-2001), playing accordion, harmonica, melodeon and keyboards. He has also performed with John Kirkpatrick in the accordion duo, 'The Sultans of Squeeze', who were included in nominations as 'duo of the year' in the 2006 BBC Radio 2 Folk Awards

Career 
Chris Parkinson has played music since the age of five, starting with the harmonica. Other instruments include the piano, guitar, concertina, tin whistle, melodeon, piano accordion, keyboard and fiddle.

He has worked with Ralph McTell, Steve Phillips and Billy Connolly

Parkinson's tune Mr Isaac's Maggot appears on the accordion box set Planet Squeezebox.

Discography 

Solo work

Parky - CPCD313
Out of his Tree - Pan Records PAN147

With The House Band

The House Band - Topic 12TS439
Pacific - Topic 12TS445
Groundwork - Green Linnet 1132
Word of Mouth - Topic 12TS451 - Green Linnet 3045
Stonetown - Harbourtown HAR019 - Green Linnet 3060
Rockall - Green Linnet
Another Setting - Green Linnet
October Song - Green Linnet

With John Kirkpatrick

The Sultans of Squeeze - Fledg'ling Records 3056

With Alistair Russell

Paddy Goes To Huddersfield – Celtic Music From Yorkshire - Glade GLDCD0201

 With Steve Phillips
Been A Long Time Gone - Clarion Records CL CD001

With Steve Phillips & The Rough Diamonds

Everyone A Gem - Good 'Ol Boy Music GOB:00:003
Live At The Grosvenor - Clarion Records CLCD003
North Country Blues - Clarion Records CLCD004

References

External links

Living people
1950 births
British folk guitarists
British folk singers
British accordionists
British fiddlers
British multi-instrumentalists